"You Used to Hold Me" is a song by American DJ/producer Ralphi Rosario, featuring singer Xaviera Gold. Released as a single in 1987, the song was a hit and remains Rosario's most popular song.

In 1994, a set of remixes was released on Strictly Hype Recordings, entitled "You Used to Hold Me '94!".

Track listing
US 12" single
A1. "You Used to Hold Me" (Kenny's Mix) - 6:28
A2. "You Used to Hold Me" (Accapella) - 1:16
A3. "You Used to Hold Me" (You Used To Beat Me Black and Blue) (Bonus Beats) - 3:22
B1. "You Used to Hold Me" (Mucho Michie House Mix) - 8:17
B2. "You Used to Hold Me" (Riviera Mix) - 4:58

Scott and Leon version
In 2000, "You Used to Hold Me" was covered by UK garage duo Scott and Leon featuring singer Sylvia Mason-James on vocals. This version was a top 20 hit, peaking at No. 19 on the UK Singles Chart and No. 5 on the UK Dance Singles Chart.

Charts

References

1987 songs
1987 singles
2000 singles
House music songs
UK garage songs